Passin' Thru may refer to:
 Passin' Thru (James Gang album), 1972
 Passin' Thru (Chico Hamilton album), 1962
 Passin' Thru (Charles Lloyd album), 2016

See also
 Passing Through (disambiguation)